Faial Island, also known in English as Fayal, is a Portuguese island of the Central Group (Portuguese: Grupo Central) of the Azores. 

The Capelinhos Volcano, the westernmost point of the island, may be considered the westernmost point of Europe (if the Monchique Islet, near Flores Island, is considered part of North America, since it sits on the North American Plate). Its largest town is Horta.

With its nearest neighbours, Pico (east across the channel) and São Jorge (northeast across the channel), it forms an area commonly known as the Triângulo (English: Triangle). The island has also been referred to as the Ilha Azul (English: Blue Island), derived from the writings of Portuguese poet Raul Brandão, due to the large quantity of hydrangeas that bloom during the summer months:

History 
During a period of medieval legends and unsubstantiated stories of mystical lands, the island of Faial first appeared on the 1375 Catalan Atlas, as Ilha da Ventura or Insula de La Ventura (English: Venture Island). By 1427 they had discovered what most had suspected: islands in the middle of the Atlantic (specifically the islands of Santa Maria and São Miguel). New discoveries would be made in subsequent years until, during his first voyage of exploration (in 1451), the navigator Diogo de Teive explored the coast of Faial.

It was the humanist friar Gaspar Frutuoso who recounted that the first explorers did not find an uninhabited island: a hermit, who had a small flock and lived in a cave in the interior, had occupied the land.

By 1460, the nautical charts would refer to this island as Ilha de São Luis. It was at about this time that Valentim Fernandes da Morávia, a German intellectual and translator residing in Lisbon, recounted the first story related to the settlement of the island. As he wrote, Frair Pedro, the queen's confessor, traveled with the Infanta Isabella of Portugal, Duchess of Burgundy, to Flanders, where he met and developed a friendship with the nobleman Josse van Huerter. During their conversations D. Pedro talked to van Huerter of the islands and of their deposits of silver and tin (which he assumed were the Ilhas Cassitérides, or in English, the Islands of Tin). Van Huerter convinced 15 other men of the profitability of a venture in the archipelago.

Around 1465, Huerter disembarked for the first time on Faial along the beach of Praia de Almofariz (now Praia do Almoxarife). The expedition remained in the area of Lomba dos Frades for about a year, until their supplies ran out. His compatriots were angered by the lack of the promised precious metals, and van Huerter quickly escaped to Flanders and the court of the Duchess of Burgundy.

In 1467, Huerter returned to Faial on a new expedition, supported by the Duchess, who "ordered men and women of all conditions, as well as priests to convey their religious orders, in addition to ships loaded with furniture and utensils necessary for the land and construction of houses, and she sent them for two years, with everything they needed for subsistence" (according to a caption made by the German geographer Martin Behaim on the Nuremberg Globe). Valentim Fernandes also noted that Isabella had ordered civil criminals to be deported to the island. Infante D. Fernando (Duke of Viseu and Master of the Order of Christ) gave Van Heutere the title of Captain-Major of the island. Immediately, the new colonists had problems in their new colony, due to a lack of potable water. They moved their settlement to the adjacent valley (which continues to bear the name of Flamengos, the Portuguese term for Flemish or literally, Flemish people). Van Huerter constructed a small chapel, consecrated in the name of Santa Cruz (Holy Cross). He eventually returned temporarily to Lisbon, where he married Beatriz de Macedo, governess of the Duke of Viseu. Still an apt negotiator, he returned to Faial promoting the settlement of the colony and his holdings. He convinced a second group of settlers, under the Flemish nobleman Willem van der Haegen (later known as Guilherme da Silveira) to bring his compatriots, their families and support staff to the island in 1467.

The settlers concentrated in the area of Conceição and Porto Pim, creating the nuclei of the Vila de Orta (later the Vila de Horta), a name transliterated from the surname of Josse van Huerter. By 1490, this Flemish community numbered approximately 1,500 people, and were joined by several families from the Alentejo, Moinho and other islands in the archipelago. The rapid growth of the island, in this phase, was the result of the cultivation of wheat, and the growth in the woad industry. It was some time later, when the island's name changed to "Fayal", due to the large number of Faya trees (Myrica faya). With the island's improving economy more Portuguese settled and rapidly the Flemish influence diminished.

In 1583, as part of the Spanish occupation of the Azores (which began with a landing party on Terceira), a Spanish fleet was sent to Faial. During the expeditionary assault, a body of armed men landed at Pasteleiro and engaged the defenders. Although reinforced by French troops, the garrison was unable to fend off the invaders. During the Iberian Union of Portugal and Spain, the island was frequently attacked by British and French pirates. Raiding parties from the Earl of Cumberland (George Clifford) and Earl of Essex (Robert Devereaux) attacked the defenseless populations between 1589 and 1597. This was partly due to the influx of Spaniards to the islands, as opportunities for Iberian businessmen improved. The privateers robbed the inhabitants and burned what they left behind, not differentiating between Portuguese and Spanish people or properties. To protect themselves, the Faialense built a large number of fortresses; in the 18th century there were more than 20. Meanwhile, offshore from Faial, on 22/23 June 1594, in what became known as the Battle of Faial Island or the action of Faial, three ships of the Earl of Cumberland attacked the 2,000-ton Portuguese carrack Cinco Chagas, which historians believe to be the richest treasure ship ever to sail from the East Indies, firing and sinking the ship immediately off the island with all hands and all cargo lost.

The Cabeço do Fogo Volcano erupted in 1672, leading to substantial emigration to Brazil,

In intervening years Horta became a stopover for Jesuit missionaries traveling to and from Brasil and Asia. The Jesuits constructed a college in Horta, as did the Carmelites and Franciscan Orders. In the 18th century, the explorer James Cook also reached the islands before initiating his Pacific voyages of discovery.

The people of Faial were active participants in the struggles between the Liberals and Absolutionists, finally deciding to favor the Liberals, welcoming the visit of King Pedro IV in 1832. For its loyalty, Horta was elevated to status of town.

In 1876 work started on the construction of a dock in the protected harbor of Horta. As time progressed, Faial's importance expanded through this dock, as a way-point to trans-Atlantic traffic. Charles William Dabney, the American entrepreneur (17941871), was responsible for the growth of the industry of the islands with whaling, wine and orange exports predominating. A philanthropic figure, Dabney was responsible for cultivating the economy of the island and supporting its population, aid to agriculture and generating markets abroad for their goods. As well as owning the Fayal shipping line, he was US consul for the Azores 18261871; one of the three Dabneys who for many years held the post of American consul for the Azores. The growth of industry and trans-Atlantic sail traffic also expanded Horta's importance, as a safe harbor and coal storage base. In 1919, the first airplane to cross the Atlantic stopped at Horta. Horta's exceptional situation also led to Pan American establishing a Clipper base there. Similarly, British, American, French, German and Italian intercontinental submarine cable stations were based in Horta. During World War Two, Horta was also an important naval base, giving shelter to some of the Allied ships that took part in the Normandy invasion.

The island, dependent on whaling and agriculture, remained prosperous until the eruption of Capelinhos volcano in 1957. Communities of the northern and western coast were harshly affected by the eruption, as agricultural lands were untillable and covered with sand and ash. This led to the migration of 4,000 people to the United States, spearheaded by members of the Portuguese diaspora in New England and Massachusetts Senator John F. Kennedy. In addition, whaling, as a viable commercial enterprise was slowly curtailed with innovations in the chemical sector and the influence of animal-rights groups.

Economic and political changes since the 1980s have helped to revitalize the island's economy and development. After the Azores gained the status of an Autonomous Region within Portugal, Horta, the island's only city, hosted the Regional Parliament (Parlamento Regional) of the Azores.

Geography

Physical geography 

Along with other islands in the Azores archipelago, Faial is of volcanic origin, being one of the most volcanically active islands of the archipelago, and is close to the tectonic divide between the European and North American Plates. The island can be considered (from a geophysical perspective) the westernmost point of Europe (the two islands west of Faial, Flores and Corvo, are already on the American plate).

This is the same fault that bisects the remainder of the Central Group of islands along a west-northwest to east-southeast orientation. Although formed by complex volcanological events, the current landmass is dominated by the crater of its central stratovolcano with relatively gently sloping flanks, showing little sign of major erosion.

The island was formed from several geomorphological structures resulting from volcanism and other tectonic forces:
 The nature of the stratovolcano structure results in an island that converges at the central Caldera Volcanic Complex, although the highest point occurs along the southern rim, at the peak of Cabeço Gordo (1,043 m above sea level). The Caldeira (Caldera) is almost circular, 2000 m perimeter, with a 400 m depth below the summit of Cabeço Gordo (almost 570 m above sea level). Its center is broken by water marshes, thickets, and minor cinder cones, and surrounded by almost vertical cliffs with a diverse vegetation, both endemic or invasive to Macaronesia. It is constituted by pyroclastic material, pumitic projectiles, phreatic and phreatomagmatic deposits and examples of pyroclastic flows and lahars.
 The Pedro Miguel Graben, located in the island's northeast, is characterized by an extensive fault system, showing the remnants of the original Ribeirinha Central Volcano that formed the island.
 In the southeast, the Horta Platform is characterized by low altitude projectiles and extensive lava flows. Several strombolian and the surtseyan cones, such as Monte da Guia, cover the area occupied by the island's main urban center.
 The Capelo Volcanic Complex is the most recent geomorphological feature, composed of a linear series of scoria cones, resulting from basaltic volcanism of low explosivity. The last eruption occurred along Costa da Nau and Ponta dos Caplinhos, near the small parish of Capelo on September 27, 1957. At first, a small "Ilha Nova" (new island) formed off the coast, quickly disappearing. During a subsequent eruption a cone and a small isthmus formed off the coast and then volcanic activity dissipated. The volcano became active again on December 16, 1957; this lasted until May 12, 1958 and connected the islet with Faial, effectively enlarging the island by 2.4 km2 and extending the Ponta dos Capelinhos into the western ocean.

The mineral fayalite is named for this island, having been first identified and described here in 1840. It is an iron-rich expression within the olivine family.

Climate

Faial has a humid subtropical climate with some Mediterranean influences, oceanic at higher altitudes. It has very mild winters for its latitude, in part due to its location in the mid-Atlantic Ocean and infuence from the Gulf Stream, averaging  in its coldest month, February, and frosts never occur other than at high altitude. For comparison, Ocean City, Maryland, at a similar latitude, is  colder in its coldest month, averaging only . Summers are warm and relatively dry. Temperatures are moderated year-round, never too hot or too cold, daily temperatures are also moderated, with only  difference between highs and lows. Average relative humidity remains high at around 80% and insolation is relatively low with around 1800–1900 hours of annual sunshine, similar to locations in coastal northwestern Europe such as Nantes, France, although the sun is stronger in Faial because of its lower latitude. Precipitation is plentiful especially in the winter months, averaging  annually. At higher altitudes (e.g. Caldeira Volcano) temperatures are cooler, precipitation and humidity are increasingly higher and fog is very common.

Ecoregions/Protected areas

In 2008, the Regional Government of the Azores established a comprehensive administrative framework to administer and promote the various environmental ecosystems of the island. These areas were reorganized under Regional Legislative Decree 46/2008/A, into the Faial Nature Park, that includes 13 protected areas:
Nature Reserves
 [FAI01] Nature Reserve of the Caldeirinhas
 [FAI02] Nature Reserve of the Caldeira
 [FAI03] Nature Reserve of the Morro do Castelo Branco
Protected Areas for the Management of Habitats and Coast Species
 [FAI04] Protected Area of Cabeço do Fogo
 [FAI05] Protected Area of Capelinhos, Northwest Coast and Varadouro
 [FAI06] Protected Area of Varadouro-Castelo Branco
 [FAI07] Protected Area of Lomba Grande
Protected Landscapes
 [FAI08] Protected Landscape of Monte da Guia
 [FAI09] Protected Landscape of the Central Zone
Protected Areas for the Management of Resources
 [FAI10] Protected Resource Area of the (Faial Sector) Faial-Pico Channel
 [FAI11] Protected Resource Area of Castelo Branco
 [FAI12] Protected Resource Area of Capelinhos
 [FAI13] Protected Resource Area of Cedros
In addition, there are a few instituted forest reserves on the island of Faial, under the authority of the Direcção Regional de Recursos Florestais (Regional Directorate for Forest Services):
 Forest Reserve of Capelo
 Forest Reserve of Cabouco Velho
 Recreational Forest Reserve of Falca
Other areas of geological or environmental interest:
 Anelares Grotto, located along the southern road of the Ribeira da Lombega, in Castelo Branco, this is a geological formation produced from a lava tube near the mountainous coast: it extends 35.5 meters from Ribeira da Lombega, is 2.5 meters wide and is 3.7 meters at its highest point.

In a communiqué to the Rebikoff–Niggeler Foundation, the group suggested that the reef formation was an important first discovery for the submarine team, which was located in the waters of the Azores since 1994, in order to document sea depth. Until this time, there were no documented records of coral reefs at such a depth in the waters of the Azores, nor at such a distance from Faial.

Human geography 
Administratively, the island is governed as one municipality, with its government seat in the city of Horta. Operationally, there are thirteen civil parishes with their own assemblies, three of which (Angústias, Matriz and Conceição) constitute the principal urbanized core:

 Angústias; urban parish that includes the escoria cones of Monte da Guia, Monte Escuro and Monte Carneiro, as well as the island's hospital, the major hotels, commercial and container port, and many historical buildings (such as the Fort of Santa Cruz, The Cedars, and the Church of Nossa Senhora das Angústias): 3,025 inhabitants (2003).
 Conceição; urbanized and rural parish connected to the city of Horta, with 1,157 inhabitants in 2001. It was one of the nuclei of the modern city of Horta, location of the historic forts of Alagoa and Bom Jesus, and location of the Courts building and Fayal Sport Club (and football field).
 Matriz; the urban heart of the city of Horta, with 2,523 inhabitants (2001); landmarks include the Horta Museum, Sociedade Recreativa Amor da Pátria, Império dos Nobres, the historic Clock Tower, the former Walter Bensaúde Hospital and the Horta Archive and the Public Library, as well as the location of the Municipal Government (Câmara Municipal da Horta).

The remainder of the parishes (except Flamengos) circle the island, all linked by the regional road network and its ancillary roads:
 Flamengos; one of the first nuclei of settlement and colonization, and the only interior/landlocked parish in the municipality of Horta founded by Flemish colonists and Portuguese settlers from the archipelago.
 Praia do Almoxarife; the beachhead of the early colonists to Faial, Almoxarife is a coastal parish on the east coast, located between Ponta da Espalamaca and Lomba dos Frades, and is known for its black sand beach.
 Pedro Miguel; located on the eastern coast between Lomba dos Frades and Lomba Grande, its 723 inhabitants lost their primary place of worship, the Church of Nossa Senhora da Ajuda, during the 1998 earthquake.
 Ribeirinha; nestled in the river valley of the Pedro Miguel Graben and existing along the fracture zone of the Ribeirinha Volcanic complex alon the north-northeast coast, Riberinha has experienced many seismic events historically.
 Salão; the smallest parish by population situated on the northern coast of Faial, a community built by Spanish settlers, that were later expelled following the end of the Iberian Union.
 Cedros; built on the coastal cliffs of the Cedros Plateau along the northern coast, it is the oldest parish on Faial, involved in agriculture and dairy industry (and the location of the milk cooperative C.A.L.F).
 Praia do Norte; a zone of recent historical volcanism, built on layers of ash and pyroclastic deposits, the parish became "extinct" between 1672 and 1845, following the eruption of Cabeço do Fogo, which depopulated the parish. Emigration also occurred following the eruption of Capelinhos in 195758.
 Capelo; a parish built along a linear series of volcanic cones, culminating in the 195758 eruption of Capelinhos off the western coast. The crisis caused the implementation of an immigration program spearheaded by Senator John F. Kennedy, that reduced the population of Faial and Capelo.
 Castelo Branco; location of the international airport, its 1,115 inhabitants are involved in a mix of agricultural and enterprises associated with primary and secondary industries along the southern coast that includes the micro-climate of Varadouro.
 Feteira; a parish dominated by agriculture, the inhabitants are equally tied to the commercial activities in Horta, developing into a suburb of the larger city.

Faial has been affected by various earthquakes and seismic events during its populated history. The most important were the 17591760 earthquakes and aftershocks that occurred around Christmas and New Year. Similar in nature, the 1926 earthquake which rumbled the city of Horta, in early-April, where damages were reported in Flamengos, Ribeirinha and Conceição. Then, on August 31 at 8:42, a new earthquake caused eight deaths and ruined buildings in Horta, as well as the parishes of Conceição, Praia do Almoxarife (ruining 220 homes), Flamengos, Feteira and Castelo Branco, Salao and most of the Lomba do Pilar. Approximately 4,138 homes and buildings were partially or totally damaged. Similar tremors and events were felt in 19571958 (Capelinhos eruption), then in 1963, and again in 1973. The 1998 Azores earthquake on July 9, which shook the islands of Faial, Pico and São Jorge at 07:19 (its epicentre north-northeast of Faial) measured 5.6 on the Richter scale and caused damages to the parishes of Riberinha, Pedro Miguel, Salão and Cedros and stronger damages in Castelo Branco (mainly Lombega), Flamengos and Praia do Almoxarife. Eight people died in the earthquake and 1,700 were left homeless.

Economy 
Faial's early economic growth was propelled by cultivation and processing of woad, a blue-coloured dye produced from the plant Isatis tinctoria. It was the only source for blue dye until the end of the 16th century when Portuguese trade routes started bringing indigo from the Far East. Economic and population growth was also spearheaded by many legends of tin and silver, perpetuated by members of the Portuguese court.

The economy of the island generated some prosperity until 1957, when the Capelinhos Volcano erupted in the western part of the island, reactivating emigration to North America, supported by promises of aid made by Massachusetts senator John F. Kennedy to the affected populations.

The main agricultural resources of the island are potatoes, cereals, fruits, and wines, along with cattle (which makes up its dairy and meat industry). The city of Horta is the centre of commerce and services of the island.

In the 1970s, after the Carnation Revolution, Portugal experienced economic growth, and an airport was opened; with it, tourists came. After Portugal's entry into the European Economic Community (EEC), the standard of living rapidly grew and today the population generally prospers.

Architecture
Faial is a tourist destination with a rich collection of historical, natural and modern attractions that bring yachts, cruise ships, tourist groups and naturalists to the hills and streets of the island. Apart from several hotels and bed & breakfasts scattered throughout the parishes, the visitor seeking sun will likely travel to the black sand beaches of Praia de Almoxarife, Conceição and Porto Pim, as well as the rock pools scattered along the coast. Varadouro is one such place, known for its warmer waters, micro-climate, summer cottages and complicated salt-water pools open to the ocean.

Civic
 Termas do Varadouro (Thermal Spa of Varadouro)
 Geological Museum of the Volcano
 Interpretative Center of the Capelinhos Volcano (including the Capelinhos lighthouse)
 Escola de Artesanto do Capelo (School of Handicrafts)

Military
 Fort of Santa Cruz
 World War Two Artillery Batteries

Religious

 Chapel of Nossa Senhora de Esperança – ruined chapel on the grounds of the parochial church, Capelo
 Chapel of Nossa Senhora do Carmo – located in Varadouro, Capelo
 Chapel of São Pedro – abandoned chapel to St. Peter, located in Feteira
 Church of Santa Catarina de Alexandria – situated in Castelo Branco
 Church of Santissima Trinidade (Holy Trinity) – located in Capelo
 Church of the Divino Espírito Santo – one of the oldest churches on the island, located in Feteira
 Church of Nossa Senhora das Dores - Praia do Norte

Culture

Festivities
Faial has a calendar of several secular and religious festivals. The most important ones occur in the summer. From Ascension Day until August, the feasts of the Holy Spirit are major events in each parish and neighborhood. During these events, a procession goes to the local church, a mass is celebrated there in conformity with a tradition/legend of Saint Elizabeth of Portugal, and then the procession returns to the local império, where a feast of meat broth and soup is served to the invited guests, and the same soup and massa sovada (sweet bread) is handed out, as a traditional sign of penitence. On Faial, generally, these feasts are by invitation, whereas on other islands public events occur.

The patron saint of Faial is Saint John, celebrated as São João da Caldeira, on June 24. This is a day celebrated with a mass at the Chapel of São João, followed by family picnics along the roadways and fields of the Caldera. Similarly, in Largo Jaime Melo in Horta, people gather from around the island to enjoy picnics, and other diversions (such as band music and/or singers).

On August 1, people celebrate the annual feast of Nossa Senhora da Guia, a celebration originally started by local fisherman in the name of the Virgin Mary. A flotilla of small boats with one carrying the statue of the Virgin arrives in the harbor at Port Pim. From there, following benedictions, the statue is taken in procession to the top of Monte da Guia, where mass is celebrated in the chapel of Monte da Guia.

The most important festival of the Faialense calendar is the secular Semana do Mar (Sea Week). It is a week-long celebration in Horta of Faial's link to the sea, celebrated in song, dance, exhibitions and kiosks selling different foods (of local and continental Portugal) and goods. During the day there are several sailing competitions and exhibits, while in the evening while many sample foods along the Avenida Marginal, others listen and/or dance to popular and/or traditional musical acts on one of several platforms devoted to bands, traditional and modern/contemporary musical artists. The events culminate with a traditional closing ceremony and fireworks display.

Tradition
The island, like some other Azorean islands, produces cheeses and other milk products, along with beef, and by-products notable in Portugal, and it has a rich cuisine that also includes local seafood.

Scrimshaw, handiwork made of whale teeth, is a traditional craft of the Azores.

Notable people 

 António José de Ávila (18071881) Mayor of Horta and 27th, 32nd and 34th Prime Minister of Portugal 18681878
 Manuel de Arriaga (18401917) a lawyer, the first elected President of the First Portuguese Republic
 António José de Ávila, 2nd Marquis of Ávila and Bolama (18421917) a military officer, politician, member of the nobility
 José de Almeida de Ávila (18441902) Portuguese Marine and Civil Governor of the district of Horta 1894/5
 Teresa Madruga (born 1953) a Portuguese actress
 Ana Luís (born 1976) a former economist and 11th President of the Legislative Assembly of the Azores

See also
List of volcanoes in Azores
Condor seamount, a submarine mountain located at 17 km west-southwest of Faial Island

References
Notes

Sources

External links

  The Azores Islands, Site about Portuguese Azores Islands

 
Mountains of Portugal
Stratovolcanoes of Portugal
Calderas of Portugal
Islands of the Azores